Dubauli is a small village in Bihiya block of Bhojpur district in Bihar, India. As of 2011, its population was 224, in 33 households. It is located a short distance northwest of the town of Bihiya.

References 

Villages in Bhojpur district, India